Their mission is to promote student achievement and preparation for global competitiveness by fostering educational excellence and ensuring equal access to all the students.

The Council of Education of Puerto Rico  (CEPR) is an agency of the executive branch of the government of Puerto Rico and the governing body that administers public policy on education standards in Puerto Rico, as well as issuing licenses to establish and operate educational institutions in Puerto Rico. The Council also ensures access to quality education for all citizens and legal residents in Puerto Rico at the level and modality they require and where they demand it.

History

The Council was formed by consolidating the Council on General Education and the Council on Higher Education on July 26, 2010 as part of Reorganization Plan No. 2 of 2010.

References

External links
www.ce.pr.gov 

Education in Puerto Rico
Office of the Governor of Puerto Rico
School accreditors